Brittany Talia Hazzard, professionally known as Starrah, is an American songwriter, singer and rapper. She has written or co-written multiple songs that have reached the top 20 on the US Billboard Hot 100, including Rihanna's "Needed Me", Normani's "Wild Side" (featuring Cardi B), Halsey's "Now or Never", Kevin Gates' "2 Phones",  Nicki Minaj, Drake and Lil Wayne's "No Frauds", and Drake's "Fake Love". Three songs she's co-written have reached number one, Camila Cabello's "Havana" (featuring Young Thug), Maroon 5's "Girls Like You" (featuring Cardi B), and "Savage Remix" by Megan Thee Stallion (featuring Beyoncé), with the latter winning her the Grammy award for Best Rap Song. 

She also contributed to studio albums including Travis Scott's Birds in the Trap Sing McKnight and five songs on Calvin Harris's Funk Wav Bounces Vol. 1, including the Top 20 single "Feels" featuring Pharrell Williams, Katy Perry, and Big Sean.

As an artist, Starrah released a collaborative project with Diplo, titled Starrah x Diplo (2017). She released her debut single, "How It Goes", on August 12, 2020, and her debut album, The Longest Interlude, on March 15, 2021.

Early life and career
Starrah grew up in Delaware as the youngest of nine siblings. She has stated that she "grew up in the ghetto" and has written lyrics about police raids she experienced as a child. Her songwriting grew from writing short stories and poems. She attended Delaware State University and moved to Los Angeles after graduation to pursue a music career. After a period of uploading music to SoundCloud and selling samples through Instagram, a manager in the industry reached out to her. He connected her to more songwriters which led to Starrah writing "Be Real" by Kid Ink in 2015, which reached No. 43 on the Billboard Hot 100.

In 2016, Starrah wrote several songs that became top 40 hits. "2 Phones" by Kevin Gates reached double platinum status. Rihanna's single "Needed Me" reached number seven on the Billboard Hot 100 and spent 42 weeks on the chart.

On September 22, 2017, Starrah released a joint EP with producer Diplo titled Starrah x Diplo.

In April 2019, Starrah formed a partnership with Hipgnosis Songs Fund. She worked closely with Madonna for her 2019 album Madame X, writing on six tracks.

Starrah released her debut single "How It Goes" on August 12, 2020.

Artistry
Starrah stated that she writes lyrics first, and then finds a melody and production to fit them. In her early career, she was sometimes turned away from studio sessions for being "too urban", but later found success with urban crossover into mainstream pop music.

Personal life
Due to a mixture of social anxiety and wishes for privacy, Starrah avoids being photographed and recognized in public. Starrah identifies as queer.

Discography

Studio albums
2021: The Longest Interlude

EP
Starrah x Diplo  (2017)

Singles

As lead artist
2014
Starrah – "Low" prod. Noah "40" Shebib
2016
Starrah – "Rush / Rush (Remix)" featuring Kehlani
Starrah – "Dirty Diana"
2017
Starrah and Diplo – "Imperfections"
Starrah and Diplo – "Swerve"
2018
Starrah – "Codeine Cowgirl" prod. Aleksei
2020
Starrah – "How It Goes" prod. June Nawakii
Starrah – "Keep Calm"
2021
Starrah - "Miss This"
Skrillex, Starrah and Four Tet – "Butterflies"

As featured artist / guest appearances
2015
Kid Ink featuring Starrah – "Blowin' Swishers Part. 2"
Jeremih featuring Starrah – "Pass Dat"
The Weeknd featuring Starrah and Jeremih – "Pass Dat (Remix)"
G-Eazy featuring Starrah – "Order More"
2016
Belly featuring Starrah – "It's All Love"
Travis Scott with Young Thug featuring Quavo – "Pick Up the Phone" 
Cashmere Cat featuring Starrah, 2 Chainz, and Tory Lanez – "Throw Myself a Party"
The Weeknd – "True Colors" 
2017
Charli XCX featuring Starrah and Raye – "Dreamer"
Big Sean featuring Eminem – "No Favors" 
Big Sean – "Jump Out the Window" 
Big Sean featuring Starrah and Flint Chozen Choir – "Bigger Than Me"
Calvin Harris featuring Young Thug, Pharrell Williams and Ariana Grande – "Heatstroke" 
Halsey – "Now or Never" 
Kid Ink featuring Starrah – "No Strings"
Major Lazer featuring Quavo, Travis Scott and Camila Cabello – "Know No Better" 
Camila Cabello featuring Young Thug – "Havana"

Songwriting credits

References

External links
 
 
 

Living people
Musicians from California
21st-century American musicians
Songwriters from California
African-American songwriters
American hip hop singers
Grammy Award winners
Mad Decent artists
21st-century American singers
American pop musicians
American women pop singers
1990 births
21st-century African-American women singers